Nina Frausing Pedersen (born 20 June 1991) is a Danish footballer who plays as a defender for Israeli Ligat Nashim club ASA Tel Aviv University. She has previously playrf for Swedish club FC Rosengård, Liverpool and Brøndby IF. She also played for the Denmark women's national football team. In 2016, she began playing for the Brisbane Roar FC (W-League). She previously played for 1. FFC Turbine Potsdam of the Frauen-Bundesliga, for Fortuna Hjørring of the Elitedivisionen and for Liverpool of the FA WSL.

Honours

Club
Liverpool L.F.C.
FA WSL Winner (1): 2014

References

External links

 
 
 
 UC Berkeley player profile
 UT Austin player profile

1991 births
Living people
University of Texas at Austin alumni
California Golden Bears women's soccer players
University of California, Berkeley alumni
Liverpool F.C. Women players
Women's Super League players
1. FFC Turbine Potsdam players
Danish women's footballers
Denmark women's international footballers
Fortuna Hjørring players
Expatriate women's footballers in England
Expatriate women's footballers in Germany
Danish expatriate sportspeople in England
Danish expatriate sportspeople in Germany
Expatriate women's soccer players in the United States
Expatriate women's footballers in Sweden
FC Rosengård players
Brisbane Roar FC (A-League Women) players
Damallsvenskan players
A-League Women players
Danish expatriate sportspeople in Australia
Texas Longhorns women's soccer players
Women's association football defenders
Danish expatriate sportspeople in Sweden
Expatriate women's footballers in Israel
Danish expatriate sportspeople in Israel
Footballers from Copenhagen